Hawksbury Lagoon is situated within the East Otago town of Waikouaiti, on the northern boundary of Dunedin City, New Zealand.

It is a designated Wildlife Refuge under the Reserves Act 1977, and is administered by the Department of Conservation (DOC). It is listed as an ‘Area of significance’ within the Dunedin City Council and Otago Regional Council Plans. It is regarded as being a regionally significant wetland.

There is a  loop walk around the lagoon margins and across causeways.

Hawksbury Lagoon is described by the Otago Regional Council as "A shallow fresh-brackish water lagoon at the mouth of the river, adjacent to the town of Waikouaiti. [There is little] tidal influence within the lagoon, as a causeway along the channel entrance restricts the entry of seawater." As at 2014 the lagoon was in a eutrophic state.

References

External links
"Hawksbury Lagoon and Beach walk," www.doc.govt.nz

Nature reserves in New Zealand
Waikouaiti
Landforms of Otago
Lagoons of New Zealand
Wetlands of Otago